Sun Sun Thatha is a 2012 Tamil language independent drama film directed by Nassar. The film stars himself in a supporting role with Ahbi and Jamali Shadat in the lead roles.

Cast  
Ahbi as Abi
Jamali Shadat as Mr. Sun Sun, Abi's godfather
Nassar as Abi's everbusy dad
Aruna Bala as Abi's mom

Production 
After a hiatus, Nassar returns to directing with this film. The film was shot in 2010 with his 12-year-old son, Ahbi and Malaysian actor Jamali Shadat, in the lead roles. The film was produced by Nassar's wife, Kameela, a child psychologist. Malaysian artist Aruna Bala and others play supporting roles in the film.

Release 
The film had a low-key release in 8 December 2012 and was released for two shows in a single theatre.

The Times of India gave the film three out of five stars and wrote that "It is not everyday that one comes across a movie that is both short and sweet. Sun Sun Thatha is just that, and all in the right proportions".

References 

2012 films
2010s Tamil-language films
2012 drama films
Indian drama films